Artibeus schwartzi is a species of bat found in the Lesser Antilles. It was previously considered a subspecies of the Jamaican fruit bat, (A. jamaicensis). It has been hypothesized that it arose from hybridization of three Artibeus species: A. jamaicensis, A. planirostris, and an unknown third species.

Taxonomy and etymology
A. schwartzi was described as a new subspecies of the Jamaican fruit bat in 1978.
In 2007, however, Larsen et al. determined that A. schwartzi should be recognized as a full species based on genetic data.
The eponym for the species name "schwartzi" is American biologist Albert Schwartz (1923–1992).

Biology and ecology
It is likely frugivorous.

Range and habitat
It is endemic to the Lesser Antilles of the Caribbean Sea.
Its range includes Barbados, Grenada, Montserrat, Saint Kitts and Nevis, Saint Lucia, Saint Vincent and the Grenadines, and Trinidad and Tobago.

Conservation
As of 2016, it is assessed as a data deficient species by the IUCN.
Very little is known about this species, and its population size and trend are unknown.

References

Bats of the Caribbean
Mammals described in 1978
Artibeus